Silverton is an unincorporated community in Snohomish County, in the U.S. state of Washington.

History
A post office called Silverton was established in 1892, and remained in operation until 1945. Silverton was named by the local miners. The Silverton Ranger District, a unit of the Mount Baker National Forest, was established in 1908 and closed in 1936 before the completion of the Mountain Loop Highway. The ranger station was re-used for an educational nature camp, named Camp Silverton, that was operated by private groups and Everett Public Schools until 1997. The camp was demolished in 2019.

References

Unincorporated communities in Snohomish County, Washington
Unincorporated communities in Washington (state)